The Heart of O'Yama is a 1908 American silent short drama film directed by D. W. Griffith. It is based on the play La Tosca by Victorien Sardou.

Cast
 Florence Lawrence as O'Yama
 George Gebhardt as O'Yama's Lover
 D. W. Griffith as Footman
 George Nichols as Grand Daimio (unconfirmed)
 Mack Sennett as Footman
 Harry Solter as Spy

References

External links
 

1908 films
1908 drama films
Silent American drama films
American silent short films
American black-and-white films
Films based on La Tosca
Films directed by D. W. Griffith
1908 short films
1900s American films